Nebulosa grimaldii is a moth of the family Notodontidae. It is found in eastern Ecuador.

The length of the forewings is 13.5–14 mm for males and 14 mm for females. The ground color of the forewings is olive brown to gray-brown. The central area of the hindwings is creamy white.

Etymology
The species is named in honor of Dave Grimaldi, curator of Diptera and fossil insects at the AMNH.

References

Moths described in 2008
Notodontidae of South America